The 2022–23 Oklahoma State Cowgirls basketball team represents Oklahoma State University in the 2022–23 NCAA Division I women's basketball season. The Cowgirls, led by first year head coach Jacie Hoyt, will play their home games at Gallagher-Iba Arena and are members of the Big 12 Conference.

Previous season

The Cowgirls finished the season 9–20 overall and 3–15 in the Big 12 conference. In the Big 12 Tournament Oklahoma State was a nine seed and beat eighth seed Texas Tech 73–58, but would lose to number one seed Baylor 36–76.

At the end of the regular season, Oklahoma State and head coach Jim Littell mutually agreed to part ways, but continued to coach through the Big 12 Tournament.

On March 20th, Jacie Hoyt was introduced as the new head coach.

Offseason

Departures

Incoming transfers

Source:

Roster

Schedule and results

|-
!colspan=9 style=""| Exhibition

|-
!colspan=9 style=""| Non-conference regular season

|-
!colspan=9 style=""| Big 12 regular season

|-
!colspan=9 style=""| Big 12 Women's Tournament

|-
!colspan=9 style=""| NCAA Women's Tournament

References

2022–23 Big 12 Conference women's basketball season
Oklahoma State University
Oklahoma State Cowgirls basketball seasons
2022 in sports in Oklahoma
2021 in sports in Oklahoma
Oklahoma State